Kalna College, established in 1943, is a college in Kalna, Purba Bardhaman district. It offers undergraduate courses in arts, commerce, and sciences. It is affiliated to  University of Burdwan.

History
Kalna College was established in 1943.

Since 1943 the college has been providing higher education to the people of and around Kalna.

Location
The college is one kilometre from its nearest railway station, Ambika Kalna. The Ganga river is one kilometre to the north of the campus.

Departments

B.Ed. Section

Language 
Social Science
Science
Mathematics

Science

Chemistry
Physics
Mathematics
Computer Science
Botany
Zoology

Arts and Commerce

Bengali
English
Sanskrit
Santhali
History
Geography
Political Science
Philosophy
Economics
Education
Commerce

Accreditation
In 2012, Kalna College was re-accredited and awarded B++ grade by the National Assessment and Accreditation Council (NAAC). The college is recognized by the University Grants Commission (UGC).

Notable Persons
 Ashim Kumar Majhi, Indian Politician

See also

References

External links
https://kalnacollege.ac.in/

Universities and colleges in Purba Bardhaman district
Colleges affiliated to University of Burdwan
Educational institutions established in 1943
1943 establishments in India